Jenkin Alban Davies (5 September 1885 – 18 July 1976) was a Welsh international rugby union player.

Life
Davies was born in Aberaeron, Wales. He was educated at Jesus College, Oxford, but did not win a "Blue". He first played for Swansea RFC in 1910. Davies played for the Wales national rugby union team on seven occasions in the Five Nations Championship. He made his debut on 1 February 1913 against Scotland and later that month played against France scoring his first international try. In the following year, he played in all four matches (against England, Scotland, France and Ireland), scoring a try in the match against France. He captained the "Terrible Eight" against Ireland in 1914, but was playing for Llanelli RFC by this time.
 
During the First World War, Davies served as a chaplain with the Royal Field Artillery. He was appointed vicar of Hook in 1924, succeeding another Welsh rugby international, William Havard. Davies was also a schoolmaster. He died on 18 July 1976 in Los Angeles.

International matches played
  1914
  1913, 1914
  1913, 1914
  1913, 1914

External links
Profile of Davies, with photograph, on the Swansea RFC website

References

1885 births
1976 deaths
People from Aberaeron
Rugby union players from Ceredigion
People educated at St John's School, Leatherhead
People educated at Llandovery College
Alumni of Jesus College, Oxford
Welsh rugby union players
Wales international rugby union players
Wales rugby union captains
Rugby union props
Welsh schoolteachers
20th-century Welsh Anglican priests
World War I chaplains
Royal Army Chaplains' Department officers
British Army personnel of World War I
Cardiff RFC players
Swansea RFC players
Llanelli RFC players
London Welsh RFC players
Glamorgan County RFC players
Oxford University RFC players